Ramji (born 31 July 1961) is an Indian film cinematographer, who has worked in Tamil, Hindi and Malayalam languages. He is well known for his association with directors such as Sangeeth Sivan, Ameer Sultan, Selvaraghavan and Mohan Raja.

Career
He initially worked as an associate to cinematographer P. C. Sreeram.

Filmography

Feature films

Webseries

Short films

References

External links
 
 Ramji at Jointscene

Living people
Tamil film cinematographers
Malayalam film cinematographers
People from Thanjavur
1961 births
20th-century Indian photographers
21st-century Indian photographers
Cinematographers from Tamil Nadu